Toshi Sabri is an Indian singer and music composer. He gained fame with the song "Maahi" from the 2009 Bollywood film Raaz: The Mystery Continues.

Background
He appeared on Reality TV show singing contests Amul STAR Voice of India (Fourth Position), "Ustaadon Ka Ustaad" and "Jo Jeeta Wohi Super Star". His younger brother Sharib Sabri is also a singer.

Discography

As Singer

As a Music Director with Shaarib Sabri

References

Indian Muslims
Living people
Musicians from Jaipur
21st-century Indian singers
Singers from Rajasthan
21st-century Indian male singers
Year of birth missing (living people)
Chishti-Sabiris